The 2019 ACC Championship Game was a college football game played on December 7, 2019. It was the 15th annual ACC Championship Game, played to determine the 2019 champion of the Atlantic Coast Conference football season. The game was held at Bank of America Stadium in Charlotte, North Carolina. The Clemson Tigers defeated the Virginia Cavaliers, 62–17.

History
The 2019 Championship Game was the 15th in the Atlantic Coast Conference's 67-year history. Last season, the ACC Championship Game featured the Clemson Tigers, champions of the Atlantic Division, and the Pitt Panthers, champions of the Coastal Division. This was Pitt's first appearance in the Championship Game, and they were the sixth different school to come out of the Coastal Division in the past six seasons. Clemson won the 2018 game 42–10 for their fourth consecutive ACC title, and went on to win the 2019 College Football Playoff National Championship.

Teams

Clemson

Clemson clinched the Atlantic division for the fifth consecutive year, and entered the game with an undefeated 12–0 record for the third time in that span. The Tigers entered the title game as the four-time-defending conference champions, and the defending national champions.

Virginia

Virginia clinched the Coastal division after defeating rival Virginia Tech in the regular season finale to finish the regular season at 9–3 (6–2 ACC). With the win, Virginia snapped a 15-game losing streak to their in-state rival. The Cavaliers made their first appearance in the ACC Championship Game, and also concluded a seven-year stretch in which all seven members of the Coastal division appeared in the title game.

Game summary

Statistics

References

Championship
ACC Championship Game
Clemson Tigers football games
Virginia Cavaliers football games
December 2019 sports events in the United States
ACC Championship Game